Laakso is an indie pop band formed 2001 in Sweden. All their records have been produced by Jari Haapalainen.

Discography

Studio albums
2003: I miss you - I'm pregnant
2005: My Gods
2007: Mother Am I Good Looking?
2007: Mämmilä Rock
2016: Grateful Dead

EPs
2003: Long Beach EP
2004: Aussie Girl
2005: High Drama EP
2005: In My Blood EP
2007: Västerbron & Vampires

Singles
2003: Demon
2004: Laakso
2015: Time of My Life

Members 

 Markus Krunegård – vocals, guitar
 David Nygård – brass, accordion, synth, glocken, backing vocals
 Mikael Fritz – bass
 Lars Skoglund – drums, backing vocals

Swedish indie pop groups